Santa María Visitación is a municipality in the Sololá department of Guatemala.

Municipalities of the Sololá Department